Alphonse Desjardins is the name of:

 Alphonse Desjardins (co-operator) (1854–1920), founder of Mouvement Desjardins credit unions
 Alphonse Desjardins (politician) (1841–1912), mayor of Montreal and Canadian cabinet minister